Koelreuteria elegans, more commonly known as flamegold rain tree or Taiwanese rain tree, is a deciduous tree 15–17 metres tall endemic to Taiwan. It is widely grown throughout the tropics and sub-tropical parts of the world as a street tree.

It flowers in early to mid-summer. Flowers are small, to 20 mm in length, and occur in branched clusters at the stem tips. They are butter-yellow with five petals that vary in length until opening. Each flower contains seven to eight pale yellow stamens with hairy white filaments.

The fruit is a brown-purplish three-lobed capsule that splits to reveal a number of black seeds.

It is a declared weed in many parts of the world, particularly Brisbane, Australia and in Hawaii.

References 

Sapindaceae
Trees of Taiwan
Endemic flora of Taiwan